The Street of Adventure may refer to:

 The Street of Adventure (novel), a 1919 novel by Philip Gibbs
 The Street of Adventure (film), a 1921 film adaptation by Kenelm Foss
 A popular name for London's Fleet Street, once the centre of British journalism